Ceratocaryum argenteum, commonly known as silver arrowreed, is a species of plant in the Restionaceae family and is native to South Africa.

Description
They flower throughout April and May. The plants release their tuberculate nut fruits in January.

Ecology
Ceratocaryum argenteum has an unusual seed dispersal strategy. It employs chemical compounds to deceive dung beetles, which treat the seeds as if they were true animal fecal matter. The beetles bury the seeds. This strategy of faecal mimicry is shared with another species, namely Ceratocaryum pulchrum. The seeds are not consumed or gathered by rodents.
Their strategy of adaption to wildfires is to re-grow from seeds after such fires occur.

Distribution
This species is found in Southern Regions of South Africa.

Taxonomy
It is the sister species of Ceratocaryum pulchrum.

References

Restionaceae
Plants described in 1841
Flora of South Africa